There were 22 teams in the 1992 Tour de France, each composed of 9 cyclists. Sixteen teams qualified because they were the top 16 of the FICP ranking in May 1992; six other teams were given wildcards in June 1992.

Teams

Qualified teams

Invited teams

Cyclists

By starting number

By team

By nationality

References

1992 Tour de France
1992